The Borough of Guildford has more than 100 current and former places of worship.  Of those standing, 83 are in use by various Christian denominations and (in the case of Guildford Synagogue) Jews; 20 have been converted to secular uses. Guildford is one of 11 local government districts in the English county of Surrey—a county immediately south of London which features the Surrey Hills AONB, market towns, ancient villages, green spaces and 20th-century suburbs. The ancient and important town of Guildford, which gives the borough its name, is also the county town.

The latest census (2011) shows that the majority of residents are Christian. The Church of England – the country's Established Church – has the most churches. The Catholic Church, Methodists, Baptists and the United Reformed Church have congregations, some of which share buildings with other denominations. Quakers have convened in Guildford since the 17th century; the Congregational movement had a large following in the area; and the Plymouth Brethren Christian Church have meeting places around Guildford town.

English Heritage has awarded listed status to 38 current and four former places of worship in the district. A building is defined as "listed" when it is placed on a statutory register of buildings of "special architectural or historic interest" in accordance with the Planning (Listed Buildings and Conservation Areas) Act 1990. The Department for Culture, Media and Sport, a Government department, is responsible for this; English Heritage, a non-departmental public body, acts as an agency of the department to administer the process and advise the department on relevant issues. There are three grades of listing status. Grade I, the highest, is defined as being of "exceptional interest"; Grade II* is used for "particularly important buildings of more than special interest"; and Grade II, the lowest, is used for buildings of "special interest".  As of February 2001, there were 30 Grade I-listed buildings, 40 with Grade II* status and 975 Grade II-listed buildings in Guildford borough.

Overview of the borough and its places of worship

Guildford is the second largest local government district in the county of Surrey, and the most populous: there were approximately 134,400 residents in 2007 and 137,183 at the time of the United Kingdom Census 2011. Clockwise from the northwest, it has boundaries with the boroughs and districts of Surrey Heath, Woking, Elmbridge, Mole Valley and Waverley in Surrey and the borough of Rushmoor in Hampshire. The market town of Guildford accounts for about half the population, and there is one other large urban centre: the towns of Ash and Tongham and their surrounding estates have about 18,000 residents. The rest of the borough is largely rural, characterised by Areas of Outstanding Natural Beauty associated with the North Downs interspersed with ancient, affluent villages.

The present borough of Guildford is dominated by the town of Guildford itself.  The ancient county town of Surrey is situated at the point where the River Wey cuts through the North Downs.  Several transport routes also converge at this point, such as the Harrow Way (an ancient trackway), the old London–Portsmouth Road and various railway lines.  The town has been important for centuries.  It was an ancient borough, the site of a Dominican friary (demolished) and a castle (extant), and a royal charter and a market were first recorded in the 13th century.  Alongside these, there were three ancient parish churches—all of which survive.  St Mary's retains its 11th-century tower and was extended in the 12th and 13th centuries.  Holy Trinity and St Nicholas' have both been rebuilt but still have some 13th-century features.  The latter also has a private chapel, the Loseley Chapel, commemorating occupants of the nearby Loseley Park manor house.  The town expanded over time, especially from the 19th century when the railways arrived, and the neighbouring village of Stoke (with its 14th-century church, St John the Evangelist's) became part of the urban area.  Particularly in the Victorian era, many more Anglican churches were provided as the population grew: Christ Church (1868), St Saviour (1899), Emmanuel (1904), and one each in the suburban villages of Burpham (St Luke's, 1859) and Merrow (St John the Evangelist's, a 12th-century church completely rebuilt in 1842).  As Guildford grew still further in the 20th century, churches were opened in the Onslow Village, Westborough and Wood Street Village areas and on the Park Barn and Bellfields housing estates.  A second church in Burpham was one of several inexpensive buildings designed for Anglican congregations in Surrey by David Evelyn Nye in the 1960s.  "Bright, cheerful and well suited to modern needs", they were operationally flexible and architecturally distinctive.  Within the borough, the churches at Wood Street and Bellfields were also designed by Nye.

Guildford town is surrounded by ancient villages, both in the countryside and on the main road and rail routes into it.  Although ribbon development has turned some into low-density suburbs, many retain their centuries-old parish churches.  For example, East and West Horsley and East and West Clandon form "a suburban chain from Guildford to Leatherhead", but the Clandons have well-preserved Norman and 13th-century churches, and the Horsleys' churches have a Saxon tower and 11th- and 12th-century fabric respectively.  Southeast of here, but more isolated and very popular with tourists, the cluster of villages around the River Tillingbourne at the west end of the Vale of Holmesdale supports a range of Anglican churches.  The landmark St Martha's Church, a ruined 12th-century church rebuilt in 1848, stands on St Martha's Hill north of Chilworth. St James's Church at Shere, "second to none in Surrey for beauty and antiquarian interest", is principally 11th- and 12th-century, and Albury's original parish church in Albury Park may predate the Norman conquest of England.  The centre of population moved, though, and a new church was built in 1842.  Holmbury St Mary and Peaslake both have 19th-century churches as well: formerly chapels of ease to Shere, the architecturally impressive buildings date from 1879 and 1889 respectively.  Nearby, a 19th-century barn in the even more isolated hamlet of Farley Green was converted into a church after being presented to the parish of Albury.  Elsewhere in the borough, medieval churches (restored to various degrees in the Victorian era) survive in the villages of Compton, Effingham, Ockham, Pirbright, Puttenham, Ripley, Seale, Send, Shalford, Wanborough, Wisley and Worplesdon.  Ash and Tongham, now part of the Blackwater Valley conurbation, also retain their old parish churches.

Roman Catholic worship was outlawed for many years until the end of the 18th century, although some owners of country estates covertly kept the faith.  The Guildford Catholic Mission began in 1857 when the priest from St Edward's Church, Sutton Park began to celebrate Mass above a shop.  In 1860 St Joseph's Church was built; it was replaced by a larger church on a different site in 1984. The west of Guildford is served by St Mary's Catholic Church, which dates from 1964 but whose origins lie in a Mass centre opened at Rydes Hill Preparatory School, a Catholic private school. The suburbs of Burpham and Merrow gained Catholic churches of their own in 1960 and 1973 respectively, although Burpham's closed in 2003 and St Pius X's Church at Merrow now serves both areas. The Church of the Holy Angels (1934) serves the Ash area, and the "nicely composed and well detailed" Church of Our Lady of Sorrows opened in Effingham in 1913.  A small church served Catholics in the Gomshall area from the 1960s until 2007, although it remains in religious use as a Coptic Orthodox church.  Most of the money was raised locally—especially by means of regular bingo games in nearby Shere, resulting in its nickname of "Bingo Chapel".

Protestant Nonconformism was strong in the area in the 19th century, and many chapels associated with Nonconformist denominations survive—although not all remain in religious use.  An Independent chapel was built in 1802 in the centre of Guildford; it later became associated with the Congregational movement, and after a large new Congregational church opened in 1863 it became a Sunday school before being converted into a restaurant.  Guildford Congregational Church on North Street was demolished and replaced by the present United Reformed Church building nearby in 1965.  A Congregational chapel was founded in Gomshall in 1825 and is still used by the United Reformed Church.  Elsewhere, there were Congregational chapels or mission halls at Compton (1876), Normandy (Willey Green) (1825), Holmbury St Mary (Felday Chapel; 1825), Pirbright (1868) and Rydes Hill (1862).  All have closed, but the 1822 chapel at Worplesdon remains in use as a United Reformed Church and in 1985 the former telephone exchange at Normandy was converted into a chapel to replace the building at Willey Green.  Westborough and Bellfields in Guildford also have United Reformed congregations, the latter as part of St Peter's Shared Church which is also used by Anglicans.

Baptists established fewer churches but can trace their local origins back further.  Charcoal Barn Chapel at Tunsgate, now demolished, is the parent of four congregations in Guildford town.  The present Grace Church Guildford met at the old chapel (converted from a barn in the 1680s) until 1953, when it moved to Chertsey Street, and is its direct successor.  Next came Guildford Baptist Church—founded in 1837 and now occupying its third building, the Millmead Centre; then Bethel Strict Baptist Chapel, founded in 1879 by Calvinist seceders; and in 1992, Guildford Park Church—a declining Evangelical church reinvigorated by a church plant from Chertsey Street.   The Chertsey Street and Guildford Park churches reunited in 2018 under the Grace Church Guildford identity.  Elsewhere, the Grade II-listed Ebenezer Strict Baptist Chapel at Ripley has been open since 1812, and a newly established group (New Life Baptist Church) owns a combined church and community centre in Stoughton.

Methodist chapels were built in several villages in the 19th century, and the Methodist Statistical Returns published in 1947 recorded the existence of nine chapels of Wesleyan origin in the present-day borough, along with a single Primitive Methodist church on Chertsey Street in central Guildford.  As well as ex-Wesleyan chapels in central Guildford (North Street) and the suburb of Stoughton, the villages of Ash, Ash Vale, Effingham, Normandy, Ripley, Shalford and West Horsley had one each.  Effingham and West Horsley are still open, and a new Methodist church was built in 1955 to serve a new housing estate in Merrow, but the others have closed; the buildings in Ash Vale, Ripley and Shalford survive in alternative uses.  A second Primitive Methodist chapel was extant in 1914, but had fallen out of use by the time the Statistical Returns were compiled. Guildford town centre's old Wesleyan chapel stood alongside its Congregational equivalent on North Street until the 1960s, when both were demolished; a new Methodist church was built, but in 2013 the congregation moved out and started worshipping at St Mary's Church as part of a formal partnership between the Anglican and Methodist Churches.  The chapel at Chertsey Street was sold to Baptists in 1953.

Building materials for churches vary across the borough.  Good quality stone has never been plentiful in Surrey, but the area around Guildford yielded sarsens and puddingstone: these were sometimes used in the construction of churches, as at Worplesdon and Ripley respectively.  Bargate stone was quarried on a small scale around Guildford town and Godalming, and it was used to build churches at Burpham, Compton, Normandy, Chilworth (St Martha-on-the-Hill), and Shackleford, as well as St Nicolas Church, Guildford and the tower at St Lawrence's Church, Seale.  "Irregular veins" of carrstone also occur locally in the Lower Greensand, and it can be seen (albeit obscured by rendering) at Wisley church.  The "curious local building practice" of galleting—placing pieces of carrstone or flint into the mortar surrounding blocks of masonry—is in evidence at Pirbright.  Most common, though, was the use of flint.  The prevalence of this hard stone around the North Downs made it "the obvious material to use" for medieval churchbuilders in Surrey.  Flints were often laid roughly and were rarely knapped, so Surrey's flint churches lack the elegance of those in other counties.  Nonconformist chapels in the area are mostly brick-built with tiled roofs, in common with the rest of Surrey; although stone was sometimes used from the late 19th century, as at Ward Street Chapel in Guildford.  David Evelyn Nye's 1960s churches used laminated wood extensively.

Some of Guildford's religious buildings do not fit these general patterns.  At Chilworth is a 1950s timber church.  A tin tabernacle survives in use at nearby Peasmarsh in Shalford parish, and back in Chilworth another (now the village hall) served as the original Anglican church.  It was replaced by the former Greshambury Institute, an Arts and Crafts-style building used by workers at a printing firm.  Two 19th-century barns in the borough have also been converted into churches: at Farley Green in 1930, and in East Horsley 25 years later.  Another conversion of a secular building took place in 1985, when the congregation of the Normandy United Reformed Church bought the village's redundant telephone exchange to replace their small chapel.

Religious affiliation
According to the United Kingdom Census 2011, 137,183 people lived in the borough of Guildford.  Of these, 60.23% identified themselves as Christian, 1.98% were Muslim, 0.95% were Hindu, 0.61% were Buddhist, 0.23% were Jewish, 0.15% were Sikh, 0.34% followed another religion, 27.78% claimed no religious affiliation and 7.73% did not state their religion.  The proportions of Christians, Buddhists and people with no religious affiliation were higher than the respective percentages across England as a whole (59.38%, 0.45% and 24.74%).  Hinduism, Judaism, Islam, Sikhism and other religions all had lower proportions of adherents.

Administration

Anglican churches

The Diocese of Guildford administers all of the borough's Anglican churches.  Its seat is Guildford Cathedral.  The 46 churches are grouped geographically into deaneries.  The two Archdeaconries of Dorking and Surrey are an intermediate administrative level between the diocese and the deaneries: Dorking, Leatherhead and Woking deaneries are part of the Archdeaconry of Dorking and Aldershot, Cranleigh, Godalming and Guildford deaneries are in the Archdeaconry of Surrey.  Dorking Deanery is responsible for Holmbury St Mary's church.  East Horsley, Effingham, Ockham and the two churches at West Horsley are covered by Leatherhead Deanery.  Pirbright, Ripley, Send and Wisley come under Woking Deanery's control.  The churches at Ash, Ash Vale and Tongham are in Aldershot Deanery.  Cranleigh Deanery covers Albury, Chilworth, Farley Green, Peaslake and Shere.  The churches at Compton, Puttenham, Seale, Shackleford, The Sands and Wanborough are part of Godalming Deanery.  Guildford Deanery covers the borough's other churches: the village churches of East Clandon, Normandy, Peasmarsh, St Martha, Shalford, West Clandon and Worplesdon; those in Guildford's suburbs and housing estates (Bellfields, Onslow Village, Park Barn, Wood Street Village, Merrow, Stoughton, Westborough and the two in Burpham); and the town-centre churches of Christ Church, Holy Trinity, St John the Evangelist's, St Mary's, St Nicholas' and St Saviour's.

Roman Catholic churches
Guildford borough has five Roman Catholic churches —in the Merrow and Rydes Hill areas of Guildford and in the town centre, at Ash and at Effingham.  In addition, there is the Roman Catholic Benedictine monastery of St Augustine's Abbey, Chilworth. Effingham is administered by Epsom Deanery and the others come under Guildford Deanery; these are two of 13 deaneries in the Roman Catholic Diocese of Arundel and Brighton, whose cathedral is at Arundel in West Sussex.

Other denominations
Guildford Baptist Church and the New Life Baptist Church at Stoughton are part of the Guildford Network of the South Eastern Baptist Association.  Ebenezer Chapel in Ripley and Bethel Chapel in Guildford are Strict Baptist places of worship  affiliated with the Gospel Standard movement.  Also in Guildford, Grace Church maintains links with GraceNet UK, an association of Reformed Evangelical Christian churches and organisations.

The 13-church Wey Valley Methodist Circuit administers Cranleigh, Merrow, Stoughton, West Horsley, Knaphill, Woking, Byfleet, Walton, Weybridge, and Addlestone Methodist churches and the shared Anglican/Methodist church of St Mary's in Guildford town centre, the united Anglican/Methodist church in Sheerwater, and the united URC/Methodist church in Godalming. The Wey Valley Circuit came into being in September 2016, bringing together the Guildford Circuit and the Woking and Walton Circuit.  The former Shalford Methodist Church was also part of this Circuit. Effingham Methodist Church is in the eight-church Dorking & Horsham Methodist Circuit.

Guildford borough's United Reformed Church congregations are split between the Southern Synod and the Wessex Synod, two of that denomination's 13 synods in the United Kingdom. The Southern Synod administers Gomshall United Reformed Church; the Wessex Synod is responsible for Guildford (Portsmouth Road and Westborough), Normandy and Worplesdon churches.  The Anglican/United Reformed shared church of St Peter's on the Bellfields estate in Guildford is also part of the Wessex Synod.

Chilworth Free Church, Horsley Evangelical Church and Send Evangelical Church are members of two Evangelical groups: the Fellowship of Independent Evangelical Churches (FIEC), a pastoral and administrative network of about 500 churches with an evangelical outlook, and Affinity (formerly the British Evangelical Council), a network of conservative Evangelical congregations throughout Great Britain.

Current places of worship

Former places of worship

Former places of worship demolished since 2000

Notes

References

Bibliography

 (Available online in 14 parts; Guide to abbreviations on page 6)

Guildford
Guildford
Guildford
Churches
Guildford, Churches